Mohamed Hassoun (born 9 June 1968) is a Syrian wrestler. He competed in the men's Greco-Roman 48 kg at the 1992 Summer Olympics.

References

1968 births
Living people
Syrian male sport wrestlers
Olympic wrestlers of Syria
Wrestlers at the 1992 Summer Olympics
Place of birth missing (living people)